Banite ("The Baths") is a village in the Central Rhodope Mountains of southern Bulgaria. It is the administrative centre of Banite Municipality, Smolyan Province. Banite is known for its mineral springs, hydro and balneotherapy centre. It is situated about 270km south-east from the capital Sofia and 40km east from the famous ski resort Pamporovo.

References

 Family Hotel "Gochovata Kashta"
 Official tourist portal of Banite municipality

Villages in Smolyan Province
Spa towns in Bulgaria